The 1924 All-Ireland Junior Hurling Championship was the seventh staging of the All-Ireland Junior Championship since its establishment by the Gaelic Athletic Association in 1912.

Offaly entered the championship as the defending champions.

The All-Ireland final was played on 30 August 1925 at Croke Park in Dublin, between Tipperary and Galway, in what was their first ever meeting in a final. Tipperary won the match by 5-05 to 1-02 to claim their third championship title overall and a first title since 1915.

Results

All-Ireland Junior Hurling Championship

All-Ireland final

References

Junior
All-Ireland Junior Hurling Championship